The 2016 Newcastle City Council Council elections took place on 5 May 2016 to elect one third of the members of Newcastle City Council in England. The elections took place on the same day as other local elections.

Despite the election, it was mathematically impossible for the Labour Party to lose control of the council given that only a third of seats are up for election. However, a number of key wards were in the spotlight.

Target wards for parties
The Labour Party sought to expand its representation throughout of the seat, capitalising on gains made in 2015 in areas such as North Jesmond. In 2015, Newcastle City Council leader Nick Forbes said he wanted to make Newcastle a 'Liberal Democrat-free zone’. Despite this however, many seats won the party in 2015 were held by the Liberal Democrats in 2016 including Fawdon, North Heaton and Castle.

Seats up for election during this cycle were last up for election during 2012. A number of high-profile councillors were up for re-election including current council leader Nick Forbes.

The official opposition to Labour, the Liberal Democrats aimed to hold as much as possible throughout the city, especially in the Castle, West Gosforth and Fawdon wards following heavy losses over the past five years. The party lost control of additional two seats in 2016, in the Ouseburn and North Jesmond wards, losing heavily to the Labour Party

The Green Party again targeted South Heaton, where the candidate Andrew Gray came second to Labour's John-Paul Stephenson, who won with 59% of the vote.

The Conservatives targeted the West Gosforth ward where in 2015, candidate Steve Kyte was only 17 votes short of winning. However, in 2016, the LibDems again held on to the seat.

Following a relatively strong showing in many seats in 2015, UKIP targeted seats in the East of the city such as Byker and Walker. Despite this, in 2016, no UKIP councillors were elected to Newcastle City Council.

Overall Results

Wards

External links
Election results by wards, 5 May 2016

References

2016
2016 English local elections